colorForth is a programming language from the Forth language's creator, Charles H. Moore, developed in the 1990s. The language combines elements of Moore's earlier Forth systems and adds color as a way of indicating how words should be interpreted. Program text is tokenized as it is edited; the compiler operates on the tokenized form, so there is less work at compile-time.

An idiosyncratic programming environment, the colors simplify Forth's semantics, speed compiling, and are said to aid Moore's own poor eyesight: colorForth uses different colors in its source code (replacing some of the punctuation in standard Forth) to determine how different words are treated.

colorForth was originally developed as the scripting language for Moore's own VLSI CAD program OKAD, with which he develops custom Forth processors. As the language gained utility, he rewrote his CAD program in it, spruced up the environment, and released it to the public. It has since gained a small following, spurred much debate in the Forth community, and sprung offshoots for other processors and operating environments. The language's roots are closer to the Forth machine languages Moore develops for his processors than to the mainstream standardized Forths in more widespread use.

The language comes with its own tiny (63K) operating system. Practically everything is stored as source code and compiled when needed. The current colorForth environment is limited to running on Pentium grade PCs with limited support for lowest-common-denominator motherboards, AGP video, disk, and network hardware.

Coloring in colorForth has semantic meaning. Red words start a definition and green words are compiled into the current definition. Thus, colorForth would be rendered in standard Forth as:
  : color forth ;

Moore developed Forth in the early 1970s and created a series of implementations of the language. In the 1980s he diverged from the standardization of the language, instead continuing to evolve it. He developed a series of Forth-like languages, each extreme in its simplicity: Machine Forth, OKAD, colorForth.

Moore has stated that color is only one option for displaying the language. One of Moore's papers on colorForth was printed in black and white, but used italics and other typographical conventions to present source code.

References

External links 
 

 

 

 

 

 

 

Concatenative programming languages
Experimental programming languages
Forth programming language family